The Pakistan Floorball Federation is the national sports governing body to promote and develop sport of floorball in Pakistan. The federation was established in 2003, in 2004 it was affiliated with International Floorball Federation and its continental association Asia Oceania Floorball Confederation.

References

 

National members of the International Floorball Federation
Sports governing bodies in Pakistan
2003 establishments in Pakistan
Sports organizations established in 2003